Xavier Guichard (1870–1947) was a French Director of Police, archaeologist and writer.

His 1936 book Eleusis Alesia: Enquête sur les origines de la civilisation européenne is an early example of speculative thinking concerning Earth mysteries, based on his observations of apparent alignments between Alesia-like place names on a map of France. His theories are analogous to those of his near-contemporary in the United Kingdom, Alfred Watkins, concerning Ley lines.

Xavier Guichard appears as a character in the novels of Georges Simenon, where he is the superior of the fictional detective Jules Maigret.

See also
366 geometry

References

1870 births
1947 deaths
French archaeologists
French male non-fiction writers
Sacred geometry